Wiman Joseon (194–108 BC) was a dynasty of Gojoseon. It began with Wiman's (Wei Man) seizure of the throne from Gija Joseon's King Jun and ended with the death of King Ugeo who was a grandson of Wiman. Apart from archaeological data, the main source on this historical period comes from chapter 115 of Sima Qian's Records of the Grand Historian. Wiman was originally a Chinese military leader from the Kingdom of Yan under the Han dynasty.

Founding 

According to Sima Qian, Wiman was a general from the Kingdom of Yan of northeastern China after the collapse of China's Qin dynasty, who submitted to Gojoseon's King Jun. Jun accepted and appointed Wiman commander of the western border region of Gojoseon, which probably corresponds to the west of the present-day Liaoning. Despite the generosity that King Jun had demonstrated, Wiman revolted and destroyed Gojoseon. In 194 BC, he established Wiman Joseon and decided to locate his capital in Wanggeom-seong (왕검성, 王險城). Many Korean historians believe that the exact location of Wanggeom-seong was Yodong (요동) in Liaodong, China.

In this period, Wiman Joseon expanded to control a vast territory and became strong economically by controlling trade between the Han dynasty and the peoples of Manchuria. The Emperor Wu of Han thought that Wiman Joseon increasingly threatened the Han dynasty, and Wiman Joseon would ally with the Xiongnu.

Canghai commandery
Around the period from 128 BC to 126 BC, Canghai commandery, covering an area in northern Korean peninsula to southern Manchuria, existed. Nan Lü (Hanja: 南閭), who was a monarch of Dongye and a subject of Wiman Joseon, revolted against Ugeo of Gojoseon and then surrendered to the Han dynasty with 280,000 people. The Canghai Commandery was established following this revolution, however in 2 years, it was abolished by Gongsun Hong.

Fall 

Wiman's grandson, King Ugeo (우거, 右渠), allowed many exiles from Han dynasty of China to live in Wiman Joseon. However, the number of Han grew, and King Ugeo prevented the Jin state from communicating with the Han dynasty. As a result, in 109 BC, the Emperor Wu of Han invaded Wiman Joseon near the Luan River. After failing several times to defeat Wiman Joseon's armies, Han Wudi tried to convince the princes of Wiman Joseon to kill King Ugeo. The conspiracy failed and it led to the destruction of the Gojoseon kingdom. After the war, Wudi of Han dynasty sentenced two generals to death for failing to defeat Wiman Joseon.

After a year of battle, Wanggeom-seong was captured and Wiman Joseon was destroyed. The Han dynasty established the Four Commanderies of Han in the captured areas, which corresponds to the current area of Liaodong peninsula and the northwestern Korean peninsula. The Commanderies eventually fell to the rising Goguryeo in 4th century AD.

Several nations were formed in its place. Among them was the Nangnang Nation. The Nangnang Nation must be differentiated from the Lelang commandery.

Monarchs of Wiman Joseon

Maps

See also 
 History of Manchuria
 History of Korea
 List of Korean monarchs

Notes

References

Bibliography

External links 
 http://www.country-data.com/cgi-bin/query/r-9500.html
 http://www.nationsencyclopedia.com/Asia-and-Oceania/Korea-Democratic-People-s-Republic-of-DPRK-HISTORY.html
 http://www.bartleby.com/65/ko/Korea.html
 https://web.archive.org/web/20030310223530/https://www.metmuseum.org/toah/ht/04/eak/ht04eak.htm
 https://web.archive.org/web/20060301054640/http://www.metmuseum.org/explore/publications/pdfs/korea/divided/History-Religions.pdf
 https://www.nytimes.com/books/first/c/cumings-korea.html?_r=1&oref=slogin
 http://www.mmtaylor.net/Literacy_Book/DOCS/Part_2_Korea.html

 
Gojoseon
History of Manchuria
Former countries in Chinese history
Former countries in Korean history